Gao E may refer to:

Gao E (writer) (c. 1738–c. 1815), Chinese author during the Qing Dynasty
Gao E (sport shooter) (born 1962), Chinese sport shooter